La Grange d'Arquien was a French noble family. People with that name included:

 Henri Albert de La Grange d'Arquien, Marquis of Arquien (1613– 1707)
 Louise Marie de La Grange d'Arquien (1638–1728), French noblewoman
 Marie Casimire Louise de La Grange d'Arquien (1641–1716), queen consort to King John III Sobieski of Poland from 1674 to 1696
 Paul-François de La Grange d'Arquien (c. 1670–1745), French naval officer and colonial administrator